The 1872 Princeton Tigers football team represented the College of New Jersey, then more commonly known as Princeton College, in the 1872 college football season. The team finished with a 1–0 record and was retroactively named the national champion by the Billingsley Report and National Championship Foundation and as the national co-champion by Parke H. Davis. Princeton played Rutgers once, winning 4 goals to 1. David T. Marvel was the team captain.

This season marked the first of four consecutive national championships, and one of 11 in a 13-year period between 1869 and 1881.

College soccer 
The 1872 team is also considered the 1872–73 college soccer champions by the American Soccer History Archives, due to the similarity of footballing codes between American and association football (soccer) during the 1870s.

Schedule

References

Princeton
Princeton Tigers football seasons
Princeton Tigers men's soccer seasons
College football national champions
College football undefeated seasons
Princeton Tigers football
College soccer national championship-winning seasons (1866–1904)